Jon Korkes (born December 4, 1945) is an American film, stage, and television actor.

Korkes was born in Manhattan, New York. He first worked in the theater in Jules Feiffer's Little Murders, directed by Alan Arkin, in 1968. Korkes later began acting in film and television, as his credits includes, All in the Family (and its spin-off Maude), The Front Page, Dr. Vegas, The Day of the Dolphin, Two-Minute Warning, The Mary Tyler Moore Show, Getting Away with Murder, Starsky & Hutch, Riding in Cars with Boys, Catch-22, The Outside Man, The Larry Sanders Show, The Out-of-Towners, Homicide: Life on the Street and The Rookies. He also played the recurring role of "Officer Tom Robinson" on six episodes in the drama television series Oz, from 2001 to 2003.

Filmography
 The Out-of-Towners (1970) as Looter
 Catch-22  (1970) as Snowden
 Little Murders (1971) as Kenny Newquist
 The Outside Man (1972) as First Hawk
 Cinderella Liberty (1973) as Dental Corpsman
 The Day of the Dolphin (1973) as David
 The Front Page (1974) as Rudy Keppler
 Two-Minute Warning (1976) as Jeffrey
 Between the Lines (1977) as Frank
 Jaws of Satan (1981) as Dr. Paul Hendricks
 Worth Winning (1989) as Sam
 Syngenor (1990) as Tim Calhoun
 Too Much Sun (1990) as Fuzby Robinson
 Getting Away with Murder (1996) as Chemistry Lab Professor
 Riding in Cars with Boys (2001) as Counselor
 The Double (2013) as Detective

References

External links
 
 

American male film actors
American male stage actors
American male television actors
Living people
1945 births
Male actors from New York (state)
People from Manhattan
20th-century American male actors